Frank Mayfield, Jr. (born 1939) is a former member of the Ohio House of Representatives.

References

Members of the Ohio House of Representatives
1939 births
Living people